Vincetoxicum shaanxiense is a species of plant in the family Apocynaceae, first described in 1905. It is endemic to China, known from Gansu and Shaanxi Provinces.

The species is listed as vulnerable.

References

Endemic flora of China
shaanxiense
Vulnerable plants
Plants described in 1905
Taxonomy articles created by Polbot